Secret Service of the Air (also known as Murder Plane) is a 1939 American adventure film directed by Noel M. Smith and starring Ronald Reagan. This film was the first in Warner Bros.' Secret Service series. The series consisted of four films, all starring Ronald Reagan as Lieutenant "Brass" Bancroft of the U.S. Secret Service and Eddie Foy, Jr. as his sidekick "Gabby." It was followed up by Code of the Secret Service, Smashing the Money Ring (both 1939), and Murder in the Air (1940), the last film in the series. Reagan was just starting out his film career and commented later that during that period, he was a B movie "Errol Flynn".

Plot
An undercover Secret Service agent stumbles upon a smuggling ring illegally transporting Mexicans into the United States by air. When he pulls a gun on the pilot on one such trip, the pilot sends the aircraft into a sudden climb, causing the agent to tumble back into the cabin; the pilot then pulls a lever which opens the cabin floor, sending the agent and six illegal aliens plummeting to their deaths.

The agent's boss, Tom Saxby (John Litel), needs a pilot to infiltrate the smuggling ring. He turns to commercial airline and former military pilot "Brass" Bancroft (Ronald Reagan), who has applied to join the Secret Service.

Arrested on a trumped-up charge of counterfeiting, Brass is locked in a cell with gang member "Ace" Hamrick (Bernard Nedell). Brass learns that the smugglers use the Los Angeles Air Taxi Company, where he lands a job (after Saxby has the regular pilot arrested). With his friend and radio operator, "Gabby" Watters (Eddie Foy Jr.), Brass convinces the ringleader, Jim Cameron (James Stephenson), to let him take over the smuggling flights. He tricks Cameron into entering the United States to be captured by the Border Patrol. After an air battle, Brass turns the smugglers over to the authorities, and is greeted by his fiancée, Pamela Schuyler (Ila Rhodes).

Cast
 Ronald Reagan as Lt. "Brass" Bancroft
 John Litel as Tom Saxby
 Ila Rhodes as Pamela Schuyler
 James Stephenson as Jim Cameron
 Eddie Foy Jr. as "Gabby" Watters
 Rosella Towne as Zelma Warren
 Larry Williams as Dick Wayne
 John Ridgely as Joe LeRoy
 Anthony Averill as Hafer
 Bernard Nedell as Earl "Ace" Hemrich
 Frank M. Thomas as Doc
 Joe Cunningham as Agent Dawson
 Morgan Conway as Edward V. Powell
 John Harron as Agent Cliff Durell
 Herbert Rawlinson as Admiral A.C. Schuyler

Production
Scenes for Secret Service of the Air were filmed at the Glendale Airport. The Glendale Airport was at the time the major airfield serving Los Angeles, but after World War II with larger aircraft and jet airliners it could not accommodate, it closed in the mid-1950s.

Reception
With Secret Service of the Air becoming a minor "B" hit, it spawned a series with three more films rushed into completion over the next 15 months. Frank S. Nugent of The New York Times dismissed the film as "... considerable melodramatic ado about nothing, since the new film is an uninspired reworking of the old story about smuggling aliens ..."

See also
 Ronald Reagan filmography

References

Notes

Citations

Bibliography

 Aylesworth, Thomas G. The Best of Warner Bros. London: Bison Books, 1986. .

External links
 
 
 

1939 films
1939 adventure films
1939 crime films
American crime films
American aviation films
American black-and-white films
American adventure films
Films directed by Noel M. Smith
Films about the United States Secret Service
Films about illegal immigration to the United States
Films set in Los Angeles
Films set in Mexico
Warner Bros. films
1930s English-language films
1930s American films
Films scored by Bernhard Kaun